The Harold H. Anthony House is a historic house located on Gardner's Neck in Swansea, Massachusetts. Built in 1922 to a design by R. Clipston Sturgis, it is a high quality local example of Georgian Revival architecture, unusual in the town for its use of brick. It was listed on the National Register of Historic Places on February 12, 1990.

Description and history
Gardner's Neck is a peninsula projecting southward into Mount Hope Bay between the Cole and Lee Rivers on Swansea's south coast. The house stands at the southern end of the peninsula, just west of the David M. Anthony House. It is a -story brick building, with a gabled roof. It has a rectangular main section, with wings extending toward the water on each side. The main entrance is set under a Classical portico with triangular pediment, supported by grouped Doric columns.

This elegant two-story brick Georgian Revival house was designed by R. Clipston Sturgis and built in 1922 for Harold Anthony, son of David M. Anthony, on land subdivided from a larger property purchased by the elder Anthony in 1883. It is rare in Swansea both as a brick house, and as one designed by a major architect. Unlike his father's house, which was intended as a summer property, Harold's was designed for year-round occupation, and started a trend of winterization of summer houses on Gardner's Neck.

See also
National Register of Historic Places listings in Bristol County, Massachusetts

References

Houses completed in 1922
Houses in Bristol County, Massachusetts
Swansea, Massachusetts
Houses on the National Register of Historic Places in Bristol County, Massachusetts